Chin-Hui Lee (Chinese name: 李錦輝) is a information scientist, best known for his work in speech recognition, speaker recognition and acoustic signal processing. He joined Georgia Institute of Technology in 2002 as a Professor in the School of Electrical & Computer Engineering

In 2012, he was elected a member of the International Speech Communication Association for his contributions in adaptive learning, discriminative training and utterance verification. He was a director of the dialogue systems research department at AT&T Bell Laboratories

Life and career 
Chin-Hui Lee received his doctorate in Electrical Engineering with a minor in Statistics from the University of Washington in 1981, his master’s in Engineering and Applied Science from Yale University in 1977, and his undergraduate degree in Electrical Engineering from National Taiwan University in 1973. He started his industrial career as a Senior Research Scientist at Verbex Corporation in 1981 and later joined AT&T Bell Laboratories, Murray Hill, NJ, USA, as a Distinguished Member of Technical Staff and the Director of the Dialogue Systems Research Department. He joined the school of electrical and computer engineering at Georgia Institute of Technology as a full professor in September 2002 after serving as a distinguished visiting professor at the National University of Singapore’s School of Computing for one year.

Awards and recognitions
 IEEE SPS Best Paper Award, 2018
 ISCA Annual Medal, 2012
 Fellow, ISCA, 2012
 Plenary Speaker, International Conference on Acoustics, Speech, and Signal Processing, 2012
 IEEE SPS Technical Achievement Award, for exceptional  contributions  to  the  field  of automatic speech recognition, 2006
 Fellow, IEEE, for contributions to automatic speech and speaker recognition, 1997
  Bell Labs President’s Gold Award, 1997

Selected publications

References

External links 
 Chin-Hui Lee profile at ece.gatech.edu
 

21st-century American engineers
Georgia Tech faculty
Fellow Members of the IEEE
Yale University alumni
National Taiwan University alumni
Year of birth missing (living people)
Living people
Taiwanese emigrants to the United States
Information scientists
University of Washington alumni
Fellows of the International Speech Communication Association
Speech processing researchers